The 1898 Colgate football team represented Colgate University in the 1898 college football season.

Schedule

References

Colgate
Colgate Raiders football seasons
Colgate football